The musical compositions of Frederick Delius (1862–1934) cover numerous genres, in a style that developed from the early influences of composers such as Edvard Grieg and Richard Wagner into a voice that was uniquely Delius's. He began serious composition at a relatively advanced age (his earliest songs date to his early twenties), and his music was largely unknown and unperformed until the early 20th century. It was a further ten years before his work was generally accepted in concert halls, and then more often in Europe than in his home country, England. Ill-health caused him to give up composition in the early 1920s and he was silent for several years, before the services of a devoted amanuensis, Eric Fenby, enabled Delius to resume composing in 1928. The Delius-Fenby combination led to several notable late works.

Chronological list of principal works
The "principal" works are those identified as such by Eric Fenby. A division of Delius's work into phases such as "apprentice" and "middle period" has been suggested by many commentators, notably Anthony Payne in "Delius's Stylistic Development" (1962).

Apprentice works, 1887–1899
1887: Florida Suite
1890–92: (Opera) Irmelin
1893–95: (Opera) The Magic Fountain
1895–97: (Opera) Koanga
1897: (Incidental music) Folkeraadet (Norwegian Suite)
1897: Concerto for piano and orchestra (original version)
1899: Paris: The Song of a Great City

"Middle period" works, 1900–06
1900–01: (Opera) A Village Romeo and Juliet
 (Orchestral interlude between Scenes 5 and 6) "The Walk to the Paradise Garden"
1902: (Opera) Margot-la-Rouge
1903: Appalachia: Variations on a Slave Song
1903–04: Sea Drift (setting of a poem by Walt Whitman)
1904–05: A Mass of Life (text by Friedrich Nietzsche)
1906: Concerto for piano and orchestra (with revised first movement)
1906–07: Songs of Sunset (poems by Ernest Dowson)

Mature works, 1907–24
1907: Brigg Fair
1908: In a Summer Garden
1909–10: (Opera) Fennimore and Gerda
1911: An Arabesque (poems by Jens Peter Jacobsen)
1911: A Song of the High Hills (wordless chorus)
1911–12: Summer Night on the River
1911–12: On Hearing the First Cuckoo in Spring
1912: Life's Dance (revised from 1899 symphonic poem La ronde se déroule)
1913–14: North Country Sketches
1914: Sonata for violin and piano No. 1 (begun 1905)
1914–16: Requiem (text by Heinrich Simon)
1915: Double Concerto for violin, cello and orchestra
1916: Concerto for violin and orchestra
1916: Dance Rhapsody No. 2
1916: String Quartet
1916: Sonata for cello and piano
1917: Eventyr (Once Upon a Time)
1918: A Song Before Sunrise
1920–23: (Incidental music) Hassan (play by James Elroy Flecker)
1921: Cello Concerto
1923: Sonata for violin and piano No. 2

Late works
1929–30: A Song of Summer
1930: Sonata for violin and piano No. 3
1930: Songs of Farewell (setting of poems by Walt Whitman)

List of works by genre
A definitive catalogue of the works of Delius was produced by Robert Threlfall in 1977, and a supplement to it in 1986. It is abbreviated as RT. The Threlfall sectioning is a categorization where works are assigned nominal numbers according to a roman-numeric genre numbering scheme. For example, A Village Romeo and Juliet is, according to Threlfall's counting, the sixth piece of dramatic work Delius composed. Thus, the piece is in Section I, number 6, so is designated RT I/6.

Dramatic works

Works for voices and orchestra

Works for solo voice and orchestra

Works for unaccompanied voices

Songs with piano accompaniment

Works for orchestra alone

Works for solo instrument(s) and orchestra

Chamber music

Piano solos

References

Delius